Bardaï is a small town and oasis in the extreme north of Chad.  It is the main town of the Tibesti Region, which was formed in 2008 from the Tibesti Department of the former Bourkou-Ennedi-Tibesti region.

History
The first European who reported Bardaï was the German explorer Gustav Nachtigal. He reached Bardaï on 8 August 1869, but had to flee on 3–4 September because of the hostile attitude of the local Toubou population. The town was invaded by the Turks in around 1908, and by 1911 they had 60 men and six cannons in Bardaï.

Bardaï came to international attention in 1974, when a rebel group, led by Hissène Habré, attacked the town and captured a French archaeologist, Françoise Claustre, and two other European citizens. The rebels established an anti-French radio station here during the civil war, which was known as the "Voice of Liberation of Chad", or Radio Bardaï. An opposition government led by Goukouni Oueddei was established here with Libyan military backing in the early 1980s. In December 1986, Habré forces attacked the Libyans at Bardaï.

The Tedaga language is spoken within the Bardaï area of northern Chad, although the Dazaga language is a secondary language. The town is served by Zougra Airport. The local football team is General Sal Football club.

References

Populated places in Chad
Tibesti Region
Oases of Chad
Tibesti Mountains